Penescosta mathewsi is a species of small air-breathing land snail, a terrestrial pulmonate gastropod mollusk in the family Charopidae. This species is endemic to Norfolk Island.

References

Gastropods of Norfolk Island
Penescosta
Vulnerable fauna of Australia
Gastropods described in 1913
Taxonomy articles created by Polbot